Arrowhead Springs Hotel a resort hotel, and during World War 2 Naval Convalescent Hospital Arrowhead Springs, is near the City of Arrowhead Springs, north of San Bernardino, California. Naval Convalescent Hospital Arrowhead Springs was a US Navy medical treatment facility during World War 2. The hotel/hospital has an outdoor swimming pool, 130 person theater, natural hot springs, lake, tennis courts and recreational facilities on 1,700 acres in the mountains. From 1961 to 1992, the resort hotel was the headquarters, training center and conference center of Campus Crusade for Christ.  In May of 2017, the San Manuel Band of Mission Indians purchased the resort.

History
The Arrowhead Springs Hotel opened in 1939 as a resort hotel in San Bernardino Mountains. It became a popular spot for Hollywood guests. Above the resort on a near by hill is an arrowhead-shaped natural landmark, thus the name. The report was designed by African American architect Paul R. Williams and Gordon Kaufmann in the art deco style. The land was home to the Yuhaaviatam clan of the Serrano people before the resort opened. Before the resort the spot was a small tuberculosis sanitarium center that had a natural steam cave and mud baths that opened in 1864.  A 1886 fire bunt down the sanitarium building.  A new hotel was built in 1905 and at the same time, the Arrowhead Springs Company was founded selling bottled spring water, Arrowhead Springs water. In 1938 the resort was sold to Hollywood group: Jay Paley, Joseph M. Schenck, Constance Bennett, Al Jolson, Darryl Zanuck and Claudette Colbert for $800,000. A 1938 fire burnt down this second resort. The group spent $1.5 million and built the current resort. The main building is four-story with two wings the center also had 10 bungalows. The interior was designed by Dorothy Draper of New York.  Hollywood guests included Charlie Chaplin, Judy Garland, and Clark Gable. Bugsy Siegel was a regular guest also. The resort was used for filming movies, including Humphrey Bogart in High Sierra in 1941. The US Navy leased the resort hotel on 7.5-acre and turned it into a 149 room hospital that opened in June of 1944, also called Naval Special Hospital, Arrowhead Springs. It was opened to help with the overcrowing at US Naval Hospital Corona. In June 1944, 500 patients were transferred from Corona to Arrowhead Springs.  At the end of the war, in November 1945, when the Hospital closed over 5800 troops had been cared for at the Hospital. After the war it returned to a resort hotel. Esther Williams made a movie, Thrill of a Romance in 1945. In 1946, the resort was purchased the Hull group of Chicago. Then in 1946, sold to Conrad Hilton for $2 million. In 1950 Elizabeth Taylor and Nicky Hilton honeymooned at the resort. Sold again in 1951 to Hilton Hotel, then to Campus Crusade for Christ in 1961. Campus Crusade for Christ moved to Orlando, Florida in 1991. In March of 1992, the resort went for sale with no buyers. The resort was vacant till sold to San Manuel in 2017.

Gallery

See also

California during World War II
American Theater (1939–1945)
United States home front during World War II
DeWitt General Hospital

References

California in World War II
Formerly Used Defense Sites in California
History of medicine in California
1864 establishments in California
Military installations closed in 1945
Resorts in California
Defunct hotels in California
San Bernardino, California